British Pest Control Association (BPCA) is a not-for-profit organisation and trade association representing over 750 organisations and more than 3500 individuals with a professional interest in the eradication of public health pests without risk to third parties, non-target species or the environment. Member criteria are strict, and include adequate insurance, professional qualifications, CPD and adherence to Codes of Practice.

BPCA provides a wide range of benefits and services to members including technical advice and support, sample documentation, and appearance on the Association's directory.

Only full servicing and consultant BPCA members appear in the web-based search or via the telephone service centre based in Derby, where BPCA is administered.

Members of the public also find the Associations A to Z of pests an invaluable tool when understanding what pests, such as wasps, rats, mice or even bed bugs invade their home.

Pests in the United Kingdom
There are thought to be around 120 million rats in the United Kingdom; some figures estimate around 81 million brown rats (Rattus norvegicus).

Training 
BPCA offers a number of training courses and exams working in partnership with The Royal Society for Public Health (RSPH). The primary qualification for pest technicians is currently known as the Level 2 Award in Pest Management.

PestEx 
PestEx is BPCA's biennial exhibition for the industry and its customers. It is a two-day event featuring industry relevant exhibitors and seminars. In 2017, there were over 2500 attendees.

PestAware (Blog) 
PestAware blogs are published once a month by BPCA and its members on different aspects of pest control.

Professional Pest Controller PPC (magazine) 
A paper and electronic magazine aimed at those working in the pest control industry and focusing on technical, commercial, customer service advice in addition to the latest news, events and updates regarding professional pest management.

See also
 List of mammals of Great Britain

References 

Trade associations based in the United Kingdom
Organisations based in Derby
Pest control organizations
Science and technology in Derbyshire